Erik Einar Christofer Malmström is a Swedish lead guitarist and founder of the band Darkane. He also plays the guitar in Non-Human Level. He used to play in Zaninez and Demise.

Equipment
Ibanez Guitars
Seymour Duncan Pickups
D'Addario Strings
Steve Clayton picks

Darkane
Rusted Angel
Insanity
Expanding Senses
Layers of Lies
Demonic Art
The Sinister Supremacy
Inhuman Spirits

References

Living people
1973 births
Swedish heavy metal guitarists
Swedish songwriters
Swedish guitarists
Male guitarists
Darkane members
21st-century guitarists
Swedish male musicians